Big Air Experience is a compilation album mixed with gangsta rap and alternative rock music released by Priority on March 25, 2003. The album consists of such popular names as Snoop Dogg, N.W.A. and Saliva among others.

Track listing

References 

Hip hop compilation albums
2003 compilation albums